A. R. R. Seenivasan was an Indian politician and Member of the Legislative Assembly. He was elected to the Tamil Nadu legislative assembly as a Dravida Munnetra Kazhagam candidate from Virudhunagar constituency in 2021 election.

References 

Dravida Munnetra Kazhagam politicians
Living people
Year of birth missing (living people)
Tamil Nadu MLAs 2016–2021
Tamil Nadu MLAs 2021–2026
Tamil Nadu politicians